Merrigum Football Club is an Australian rules football club based in Merrigum in North Eastern Victoria, Australia.  The club was established in 1909 at Junior level and formed a senior team in 1922 in the Cooma Football Association. They currently compete in the Kyabram & District Football League.  The club is known as The Bulldogs.

Premierships
1949 (Kyabram District Football Association)
1950 (Kyabram District Football Association)
1951 (Kyabram District Football Association)
1953 (Kyabram District Football Association)
1957 (Kyabram District Football Association)
1986 (Kyabram District Football League)
1987 (Kyabram District Football League)
1990 (Kyabram District Football League)
2015 (Kyabram District football League)

References

External links
Official Kyabram and District Football League Website

Kyabram & District Football League clubs
1909 establishments in Australia
Australian rules football clubs established in 1909